The Fouga CM.8 or Castel-Mauboussin CM.8 was a French sailplane of the 1950s, most notable in retrospect due to its place in the development of the Fouga CM.170 Magister jet trainer.

Design and development
The CM.8 was a single-seat aircraft of conventional sailplane design and designed for aerobatics. Two prototypes were built: the CM.8/13, with a 13-metre wingspan and a conventional empennage, and the CM.8/15 with a 15-metre wingspan and a V-tail.

The pleasing performance of these aircraft led to experiments with mounting a small turbojet on the dorsal fuselage, exhausting between the tail fins. The first of these flew on 14 July 1949, powered by a Turbomeca Piméné. Designated the CM.8R this combined the 13-metre wing of the CM.8/13 with the tail of the CM.8/15. Two examples were built, and as experiments progressed in the 1950s, they were fitted with increasingly powerful engines, and increasingly shorter wingspans. A twin-fuselage example was also built as the CM.88 as an engine testbed.

Variants
Fouga CM.8
Fouga CM.8 Acro
Fouga CM.8/13
Fouga CM.8/15
Fouga CM.8/13 Sylphe démotorisé
Fouga CM.8 R13 Cyclone
Fouga CM.8 R13 Sylphe II
Fouga CM.8 R13 Sylphe III
Fouga CM.8 R9.8 Cyclope I
Fouga CM.8 R9.8 Cyclope II
Fouga CM.8 R8.3 Midget Version intended for air racing, powered by  Turbomeca Palas engine, with fuselage of Cyclope, and wings of reduced span and area . Small production series (eight – twelve) built.

Specifications (CM.8/13)

See also

References

Bibliography

 
 
 
 Planeurs et Avions

1940s French sailplanes
CM.8
Glider aircraft
Aircraft first flown in 1949
V-tail aircraft